Joniec  is a village in Płońsk County, Masovian Voivodeship, in east-central Poland. It is the seat of the gmina (administrative district) called Gmina Joniec.

The village has a population of 270.

See also
 Official page of brass band from Joniec

References

Joniec